The Oxford Book of Science Fiction Stories is a book of science fiction stories edited by  Tom Shippey, published in 1992 then reissued in 2003.

Contents

References 

1992 anthologies
Science fiction anthologies
British science fiction books
Oxford University Press books
British anthologies